His Butler's Sister is a 1943 American romantic comedy film directed by Frank Borzage and starring Deanna Durbin. The supporting cast includes Franchot Tone, Pat O'Brien, Akim Tamiroff, Evelyn Ankers and Hans Conried. The film was nominated for an Oscar for Best Sound Recording (Bernard B. Brown).

Plot
Ann Carter visits New York City to see her half-brother, and to try to start a music career.  He works as a butler for Charles Gerard, a Broadway producer, so Ann gets a job working for him as a maid.

Durbin performs a notable medley of Russian folk songs including "Yamschtschick," "Kalitka" and "Two Guitars." (American Film Institute Catalog)

Cast
 Deanna Durbin as Ann Carter
 Franchot Tone as Charles Gerard
 Pat O'Brien as Martin Murphy
 Akim Tamiroff as Popoff
 Alan Mowbray as Buzz Jenkins
 Walter Catlett as Mortimer Kalb
 Elsa Janssen as Severina
 Evelyn Ankers as Elizabeth Campbell
 Frank Jenks as Emmett
 Sig Arno as Moreno
 Hans Conried as Reeves
 Florence Bates as Lady Sloughberry
 Roscoe Karns as Fields
 Russell Hicks as Sanderson
 Andrew Tombes as Brophy
 Stephanie Bachelor as Dot Stanley
 Marion Pierce as Margaret Howard
 Iris Adrian as Sunshine Twin
 Robin Raymond as Sunshine Twin

Production
The film was announced in January 1943. In April, Frank Borzage signed to direct and Pat O'Brien to star. In May, Franchot Tone signed to play the male lead. The film was then known as My Girl  Godfrey. Durbin enjoyed working with Borzage.

References

External links

 
 

1943 films
1943 romantic comedy films
American romantic comedy films
American black-and-white films
Films directed by Frank Borzage
Universal Pictures films
Films scored by Hans J. Salter
1940s English-language films
1940s American films